This is a list of notable Slovenian musical groups

A 
 Adi Smolar - folk pop rock
 Alenka Godec - pop
 Alenka Gotar - ethno pop, pop
 Alya - pop
 Ana Pupedan - pop
 Anzej Dezan - pop
 Anja Rupel - pop
 Atomik Harmonik - turbo-folk-pop
 Avsenik Brothers Ensemble - polka

B 
 Big Foot Mama - pop rock
 Billysi - pop rock
 Borghesia - early ebm
 Buldožer - rock
Bojan Sedmak - feminist

Č 
 Čedahuči - folk rock

D 
 Dan D - rock

G 
 Gal Gjurin - pop
 Gramatik - Chillhop, instrumental hip hop, downtempo

H 
 Helena Blagne Zaman - pop

I 
 Iztok Mlakar - folk

J 
 Joker Out - indie rock

K 
 Karmen Stavec - pop
 Klemen Klemen - rap

L 
 Lačni Franz - rock, Yugoslavian new wave, progressive
 Laibach - industrial
 Lara-B - modern rock

M 
 Maja Keuc - pop
 Majda Sepe - popular
 Maraaya – pop, R&B, soul
 Melodrom - alternative, electro
 Murat & Jose - hip hop

N 
 N'Toko - rap
 Neisha - pop
 Negligence (band) - metal
 Niet - punk rock
 Nikolovski - rap
 Nuša Derenda - pop/popular

O 
 Omar Naber - pop-rock
 Orlek - folk rock
 Oto Pestner - pop, gospel

P 
 Pankrti - punk rock
 Peter Lovšin - rock
 Prospect - progressive metal
 PureH - experimental

R 
 Robert Pešut Magnifico - folk-pop

S 
 Sestre - pop
 Siddharta - pop rock
 Slon in Sadež - various, humorous
 Severa Gjurin - pop

Š 
 Šank Rock - rock

T 
 Tomaž Pengov - folk
 Turbo Angels - turbo folk
 Trash Candy - pop punk
 Trkaj - rap
 Top Stripper - hard rock

V 
 Vlado Kreslin - folk rock
 Videosex - new wave

W 
 Within Destruction - deathcore, slam

Z 
 Zablujena generacija - punk rock
 Zaklonišče prepeva - punk/rock
 Zmelkoow - rock
 Zoran Predin - rock

Musical